Chantenay-Villedieu is a commune in the Sarthe department in the region of Pays de la Loire in north-western France.

Places and monuments
The priory Saint Jean-Baptiste
Lieu: center market town, place of the town hall.
Ancient priory founded by the monks of the abbey of the Dressmaking of Mans (fine 11th or the beginning of the 12th century), occupied by Benedictines until 1412.

See also
Communes of the Sarthe department

References

External links

Chantenay-Villedieu History

Communes of Sarthe